Malcolm Wynn-Jones (born 29 December 1958 in Dunvant, Wales; full name Malcolm Peregrine Geoffrey St. John Wynn Jones) was the fictional MI5 analyst, featured in the British television series Spooks, also known as MI5 in the United States. Malcolm was played by Hugh Simon from the start of Spooks in 2002 until the character was retired at the start of Series 8 in 2009. The character however, made a return in the latter stages of Series 9 in 2010. Malcolm returned in Spooks: The Greater Good.

Spooks profile
Malcolm served as a technician and data analyst for the team. In the script for one of his first episodes, he is described as being "an odd-looking man in a bow-tie. He sounds almost autistic--a walking intelligence encyclopaedia." Although not much is known about his personal life, he does pose as Ruth's brother "Giles" when she falls for someone the team are watching, and Series 5 Episode 6 revealed that he is a collector of 1970's bugs. His mother is still alive, as  mentioned by him in episode 1 of series 7 and again in episode of 8 of the same series and seen on-screen in episode 6 of series 9. In the officially licensed tie-in book, "Harry's Diary", it is revealed that Malcolm joined Section D in January 1990.

He is also known to quote from works of literature, for example:

He is a hard, devoted worker, and MI5 training assessments show him as an excellent surveillance officer, linguist and marksman. He is also very good in technical matters, as well as teamwork. He attained an above-average score on the training exam of 3.1. Due to his asthma, he is not physically fit, and has a tendency to panic under pressure. He was known to spend a great deal of time at Thames House - in 2005 a Section X report stated that Malcolm 'continued to take more than 90% of his meals in the office canteen'.

Malcolm is distraught when his best friend and colleague Colin Wells is murdered in Series 5, Episode 1.  Senior Case Officer Adam Carter persuades Malcolm to stay on the job after Malcolm says that he can't pretend that nothing happened to Colin.

Another moment where Malcolm appears to be susceptible to faltering under pressure is in the episode Diana, in which he is faced with a bomb and has to cut a wire to stop it from going off and killing himself and Adam. He freezes, not knowing which wire to cut. He later reveals to Ruth that "bravery terrifies me".

However, in the first episode of Series 8, Malcolm formed a bond with Ruth's step-son Nico and had him and Ruth's husband moved to a better safe house after Ruth's return from Cyprus. Rogue elements within the CIA and MI6 kidnapped Nico and Ruth's husband, holding them hostage without their knowledge. Malcolm discovered their location after the execution of Ruth's husband and offered himself to the lead kidnapper to be shot instead of Nico. Malcolm managed to calm Nico by telling him a story about a dog. He persuaded the kidnapper not to execute him, offering his own life instead. The kidnapper decided not to shoot.

Not long after the incident, Malcolm told Harry that he wanted to retire from MI5, believing he was too old to continue. Harry begrudgingly agreed and Malcolm subsequently left the Grid.

Malcolm was then replaced by the much younger Tariq Masood who began in Season 8 Episode 2.

Malcolm was one of two characters who returned in series 9 along with Nicholas Blake. He appeared in the 6th episode of the 9th series, where Lucas shows up at his house, asking for the Albany file, so he could give it to Vaughn Edwards, a mysterious figure from Lucas's past. Malcolm gave it to him, but appeared to know of Lucas's illicit intentions and murky past, as the file was a fake. Upon learning this, Lucas stormed Malcolm's home, but it had been completely cleared out. After three days of remaining on the road to lose any potential tail, Malcolm returns to the Grid to inform Harry of the situation.

It was also in this episode that Malcolm's mother, only mentioned before, appeared.

In Spooks: The Greater Good, Malcolm helps Harry download a part of the MI5 archives to find the Russian officials friendly to the West. The archives were to be Harry's part of a deal made with the FSB to recover the wife of terrorist Adem Qasim. Harry later asked for Malcolm's help to monitor surveillance during a prisoner exchange between himself and terrorist Adem Qasim. After the exchange failed, Harry instructed Malcolm to 'make himself scarce', leading the former agent to abandon his van and his equipment. Malcolm also knew former MI5 operative Will Halloway, who had worked under him three years previously before being decommissioned.

References

Television characters introduced in 2002
Fictional hackers
Spooks (TV series) characters
Fictional Welsh people